Shelton Hall may refer to:

 Shelton Hall (Boston University), a dormitory at Boston University
 Shelton Hall (England), an estate in Shelton and Hardwick parish, England

Architectural disambiguation pages